Anoplodera is a genus of beetle in the family Cerambycidae and tribe Lepturini.

Subgenera and Species
BioLib lists:
subgenus Anoplodera Mulsant, 1839
 Anoplodera atramentaria (Ganglbauer, 1890)
 Anoplodera corvina Holzschuh, 1993
 Anoplodera kingana (Pic, 1903)
 Anoplodera peregrina Holzschuh, 1993
 Anoplodera rufihumeralis (Tamanuki, 1938)
 Anoplodera rufipes (Schaller, 1783)
 Anoplodera sexguttata (Fabricius, 1775): commonly known as the six spotted longhorn beetle. 
subgenus Anoploderomorpha Pic, 1901
 Anoplodera abstrusa (Holzschuh, 1989)
 Anoplodera binotata Gressitt, 1935
 Anoplodera carbonaria (Holzschuh, 1993)
 Anoplodera curta (Holzschuh, 2009)
 Anoplodera cyanea (Gebler, 1832)
 Anoplodera densepunctata (Hayashi & Villiers, 1994)
 Anoplodera diplosa (Holzschuh, 2003)
 Anoplodera excavata (Bates, 1884)
 Anoplodera formosana (Matsushita, 1933)
 Anoplodera monticola (Nakane, 1955)
 Anoplodera pubera (Say, 1826)
 Anoplodera rubripennis (Pic, 1927)
 Anoplodera sepulchralis (Fairmaire, 1889)
 Anoplodera tenebraria (Holzschuh, 1995)
 Anoplodera villigera (Holzschuh, 1991)
subgenus Falsojudolia Pic, 1935
 Anoplodera lunatipennis (Pic, 1935)
subgenus Robustanoplodera Pic, 1954
 Anoplodera bicolorimembris Pic, 1954
 Anoplodera inauraticollis (Pic, 1933)
 Anoplodera lepesmei (Pic, 1956)
 Anoplodera taiyal (Shimomura, 1993)
 Anoplodera tricolor Gressitt, 1935
 Anoplodera viridipennis (Pic, 1923)

References

Lepturinae